SMA Negeri 66 Jakarta (66 Senior High School of Jakarta) is an Indonesian public high school. It is managed by the Ministry of Education and Culture Republic (Kementerian Pendidikan dan Kebudayaan Republik Indonesia). The school is located at Jl. Bango III, Pondok Labu, Cilandak, South Jakarta, Jakarta, Indonesia.

History
In July 1980, SMA Negeri 34 Jakarta (34 State Senior High School of Jakarta) asked for a license to open Kelas Jauh. On 6 August 1980 the license was approved. A year of preparation preceded the launch on 20 July 1981. After less than a year of operation, on 10 April 1982 it was declared that "SMAN 34 Jakarta Kelas Jauh" would officially become SMA Negeri 66 Jakarta. A full building rehabilitation followed. From 2002-2004 SMAN 66 Jakarta moved to SDN Pondok Labu 12 (12th Pondok Labu Primary School of Jakarta), SDN Pondok Labu 13 (13th Pondok Labu Primary School Jakarta), and SDN Pondok Labu 15 (15th Pondok Labu Primary School of Jakarta). On 24 January 2004, the rehabilitation finished and all elements moved to the new building. The Governor of Jakarta Sutiyoso officially opened SMAN 66 Jakarta on 6 February 2004.

In 2007 the new Khunuzul 'Ibad mosque opened. In 2019 B building was finished. It hosts the counselor's room and a new hall called the B building hall. Science is taught in the B building as well. 

In 2016 SMAN 66 Jakarta held a cup competition called BATIC CUP. It was deemed successful, but because of some trouble after the event, cup competitions were not held thereafter.

Leadership 
Principals
 Priatna Sutisna (1981-1989)
 Hudiyah Sembada (1989-1993)
 Suyitno (1993-1996)
 Sudiyati Supangat (1996-2000)
 Ali Amrin M.M. (2000-2003)
 H. Muchtar Effendi (2003-2006)
 Maman Suwarman (2006-2009)
 Sugiyono, M.Pd, M.Si (2009-2013)
 H. Suhari (2013-2015)
 H. Sukarmo, M.Pd (2015 -2016)
 Kusnyoto,S.Pd ( 2017–2021)
 Drs. Deny Boy, MM (2021–present)

Curriculum
SMAN 66 Jakarta used Kurikulum 2013 (2013 Curriculum) for X, XI, and XII grade class. This curriculum in SMAN 66 Jakarta consists of:

Program Wajib (General Programme) 
 Religion Education

 Islam
 Christian
 Catholic

 Indonesian Language
 Pancasila and Nationality Education
 Indonesian History
 English
 Mathematic
 Art
 Entrepreneurship
 Sport, Physical, and Health Education

Elected Programme 
Program Peminatan Matematika dan Ilmu Pengetahuan Alam (Mathematic and Science Programme)
 Mathematic
 Physics
 Biology
 Chemical
Program Peminatan Ilmu Pengetahuan Sosial (Social Science Programme)
 Sociology
 World History
 Economy
 Geography
Injury Programme (include in Elected Programme)
 Japanese Language
 English (Language and Literature)

Facilities
Facilities include:
 3 Levels Building (A and B building)
 21 Classrooms with AC
 Wi-Fi 
 Audio Visual in classroom
 Mosque
 Toilet
 Biology Laboratory
 Physics Laboratory
 Chemical Laboratory
 Language Laboratory
 Computer Laboratory
 Hall Room
 School Administration System Room (SAS)
 Principal Room
 Teacher's Room
 First Aid Room / UKS
 Counselling Room
 Student Council Room
 Guest Room
 Administration Room
 Scout's Room
 ROHKRIS/Rohani Kristen's Pray Room
 Al-Qur'an Speaker Room
 Library
 Cooperation 
 Canteen
 Football Field
 SRT

Extracurricular
Extracurricular programs include:
 Grease Sixtysix (Modern Dance)
 Samantha D'Six (Traditional Saman Dance)
 Japanese Club
 Cinematography
 Taekwondo
 Pencak Silat
 Karya Ilmiah Remaja/KIR (Youth Scientific Art in Science)
 Palang Merah Remaja/PMR (Youth Red Cross)
 Sixtysix Badminton
 Sixtysix FC (Football and Futsal)
 Sixtysix BC (Basketball)
 Paskibra SMAN 66 Jakarta (Flag Hoisting Troop)
 Rohani Islam/ROHIS (for learn more about Islam)
 Rohani Kristen/ROHKRIS (for learn more about Christian)
 Rohani Katolik/ROKAT (for learn more about Catholic)
 Bahana Patria 66 (66's School Choir)
 TERASONTIME 66 (Theater)
 Balaputradewa & Pramodhawardani (Scout)
 Bango 66 Tubir Fight Club (Fight)

Events
 BATIC (Bango Tiga Cup) is an event of 66 SHS and organized by OSIS SMAN 66 Jakarta (Student Council of 66 SHS Jakarta). This competition consists of futsal, basketball, pencak silat, saman dance, modern dance, and more. The participants of this competition were from Jakarta, Depok, and Tangerang.
 Let's Explore Your Creativity For Event Sixtysix (LEXURAFE'S) is annual event of SMA Negeri 66 Jakarta and organized by Paskibra (Resimen Pasukan Jayakarta) and SMAN 66 Jakarta. The participants were from Java and Bali.
 KATION'S DAY is an event of 66 SHS to celebrate Kartinis's Day (21 April) and National Education's Day (2 May). The participants are students of 66 SHS.
 Pesantren Kilat is a Ramadhan event. All Muslim students participate.
 LOKETA (Lomba Keterampilan Agama) is an event organized by ROHIS
 HiCollege is training about knowledge for college.
BASED 2021 is an MPK/OSIS work program at SMAN 66 Jakarta which was implemented from January 30, 2021, to February 9, 2021. Donations were collected and handed over to Sekolah Relawan on February 10, 2021, to be given to those affected by natural disasters.
TAKTIS is a takjil sharing program in the neighborhood of SMAN 66 Jakarta with the aim of sharing and increasing concern for others. This activity was carried out on May 2, 2021.

See also
 List of Schools in Indonesia

References

Schools in Jakarta
Senior high schools in Indonesia
Educational institutions established in 1981
1981 establishments in Indonesia